Fred Walker (3 July 1913 – 1978) was an English footballer who played as a defender.

Career
Walker began his career with Metro Shaft, before moving to Wednesbury. Walker later moved to Walsall, before joining Sheffield Wednesday in 1937. Walker made 12 Football League appearances for Sheffield Wednesday, scoring once, over the course of almost two years, before the outbreak of World War II. Following the war, Walker played for Chelmsford City.

References

Sportspeople from Wednesbury
1913 births
1978 deaths
Association football wingers
English footballers
Walsall F.C. players
Sheffield Wednesday F.C. players
Chelmsford City F.C. players
English Football League players
Southern Football League players